The 2004 Tampa Bay Devil Rays season was their seventh since the franchise was created. This season, they finished fourth in the AL East division, 3 games ahead of the Toronto Blue Jays, who finished in last place. They managed to finish the season with a record of 70–91, finishing out of last for the first time in their 7-year history. Their manager was Lou Piniella who entered his second season with the Devil Rays.

Regular season

Season standings

Record vs. opponents

Notable transactions
February 10, 2004: Midre Cummings was signed as a free agent with the Tampa Bay Devil Rays.
July 30, 2004: Scott Kazmir was traded by the New York Mets with Jose Diaz to the Tampa Bay Devil Rays for Bartolomé Fortunato and Víctor Zambrano.
August 19, 2004: Randall Simon was signed as a free agent with the Tampa Bay Devil Rays.
September 10, 2004: Randall Simon was released by the Tampa Bay Devil Rays.

Roster

Player stats

Batting

Starters by position 
Note: Pos = Position; G = Games played; AB = At bats; H = Hits; Avg. = Batting average; HR = Home runs; RBI = Runs batted in

Other batters 
Note: G = Games played; AB = At bats; H = Hits; Avg. = Batting average; HR = Home runs; RBI = Runs batted in

Pitching

Starting pitchers 
Note: G = Games pitched; IP = Innings pitched; W = Wins; L = Losses; ERA = Earned run average; SO = Strikeouts

Other pitchers 
Note: G = Games pitched; IP = Innings pitched; W = Wins; L = Losses; ERA = Earned run average; SO = Strikeouts

Relief pitchers 
Note: G = Games pitched; W = Wins; L = Losses; SV = Saves; ERA = Earned run average; SO = Strikeouts

Farm system

References

External links
2004 Tampa Bay Devil Rays at Baseball Reference
2004 Tampa Bay Devil Rays team page at www.baseball-almanac.com

Tampa Bay Devil Rays seasons
Tampa Bay Devil Rays season
Tampa Bay Devil Rays